Donald Joseph Ward (October 19, 1935 – January 6, 2014)  was a Canadian professional ice hockey defenceman. He played 34 games in the National Hockey League with the Chicago Black Hawks and Boston Bruins between 1957 and 1960. The rest of his career, which lasted from 1956 to 1973, was mainly spent with the Seattle Totems in the minor Western Hockey League.

Early life
Ward was born on October 19, 1935, in Sarnia, Ontario, to Agnes and Joseph Ward.

Playing career

Ward played 34 games in the National Hockey League for the Chicago Black Hawks and Boston Bruins in the late 1950s.

Personal life

Ward is the father of Joe Ward, who also played professional ice hockey.

Retirement and death

After retiring from hockey in following the 1972/73 season, Ward went to work for Ellstrom Manufacturing staying on until retiring in 2006.

He died on January 6, 2014, at the age of 78.

Career statistics

Regular season and playoffs

References

External links
 

1935 births
2014 deaths
Boston Bruins players
Buffalo Bisons (AHL) players
Calgary Stampeders (WHL) players
Canadian ice hockey defencemen
Chicago Blackhawks players
Greensboro Generals (EHL) players
Ice hockey people from Ontario
Providence Reds players
Seattle Totems (WHL) players
Sportspeople from Sarnia
Windsor Bulldogs (OHA) players
Winnipeg Warriors (minor pro) players